Lee Meng Yean (born 30 March 1994) is a Malaysian badminton player. Together with Chow Mei Kuan, she won the 2018 Syed Modi International and achieved a career-high ranking of 10 in women's doubles.

Career 
She was the 2011 Asian Junior Badminton Championships silver medalist. In 2013, she won a bronze medal at the BWF World Junior Championships and the Summer Universiade. In 2018, they were runners-up at the 2018 Russian Open. In 2019, they lost in the 2019 India Open final to future Olympic gold medalists Greysia Polii and Apriyani Rahayu.

In the same year, she won a bronze medal at the Southeast Asian Games. They competed in the 2020 Summer Olympics but lost in the group stage. In 2022, she was appointed as the coach for women's doubles by the Badminton Association of Malaysia.

Achievements

Southeast Asian Games 
Women's doubles

Summer Universiade 
Women's doubles

BWF World Junior Championships 
Girls' doubles

Asian Junior Championships 
Girls' doubles

BWF World Tour (1 title, 2 runners-up) 
The BWF World Tour, which was announced on 19 March 2017 and implemented in 2018, is a series of elite badminton tournaments sanctioned by the Badminton World Federation (BWF). The BWF World Tour is divided into levels of World Tour Finals, Super 1000, Super 750, Super 500, Super 300 (part of the HSBC World Tour), and the BWF Tour Super 100.

Women's doubles

BWF International Challenge/Series (2 titles, 4 runners-up) 
Women's doubles

  BWF International Challenge tournament
  BWF International Series tournament
  BWF Future Series tournament

References

External links 
 

1994 births
Living people
People from Malacca
Malaysian sportspeople of Chinese descent
Malaysian female badminton players
Badminton players at the 2018 Asian Games
Asian Games competitors for Malaysia
Competitors at the 2013 Southeast Asian Games
Competitors at the 2017 Southeast Asian Games
Competitors at the 2019 Southeast Asian Games
Southeast Asian Games silver medalists for Malaysia
Southeast Asian Games bronze medalists for Malaysia
Southeast Asian Games medalists in badminton
Universiade bronze medalists for Malaysia
Universiade medalists in badminton
Medalists at the 2013 Summer Universiade
Badminton players at the 2020 Summer Olympics
Olympic badminton players of Malaysia